The Awards and decorations of the United States Department of the Navy are the military awards and decorations which are presented to members of the United States Navy and United States Marine Corps under the authority of the Secretary of the Navy.

Other military service members may also receive specific Navy Department military awards, provided such service members are performing duty under a Navy or Marine Corps command.  Likewise, a Navy or Marine Corps service member may receive medals and decorations of another military branch, if cross assigned to a command of the respective service.  All Navy and Marine Corps members are eligible to receive inter-service awards and decorations as well as approved foreign awards and International awards.

Department of the Navy awards

Navy and Marine Corps decorations

Expeditionary Medals

Good Conduct and Reserve Medal

Navy and Marine Corps unit awards

Navy and Marine Corps ribbon only awards

Marksmanship awards

U.S. Navy

U.S. Marine Corps

Notes 
 * = Awarded only to sailors
 ** = Awarded only to Marines
No asterisk indicates that the decoration is awarded to both services

External links 
U.S. Navy order of precedence
U.S. Navy ribbon checker (no devices) 
U.S. Marine Corps ribbon checker (no devices)

Awards and decorations of the United States Marine Corps
Military awards list